Milad Masaeli (born 28 May 1988) is an Iranian handball player for Al Arabi Qatar and the Iranian national team.

References

1988 births
Living people
Iranian male handball players
Asian Games silver medalists for Iran
Asian Games medalists in handball
Handball players at the 2010 Asian Games
Medalists at the 2010 Asian Games
Handball players at the 2018 Asian Games
21st-century Iranian people